The 1998 Molson Indy Toronto was the eleventh round of the 1998 CART FedEx Champ Car World Series season, held on July 19, 1998, on the streets of Exhibition Place in Toronto, Ontario, Canada. Alex Zanardi passed Michael Andretti with three laps to go to win the race, after Andretti had inherited the lead when pole-sitter Dario Franchitti retired due to a brake failure.

Starting grid
 Dario Franchitti (second straight pole in Toronto)
 Alex Zanardi
 Michael Andretti
 Gil de Ferran
 Christian Fittipaldi
 Jimmy Vasser
 Tony Kanaan (R)
 Scott Pruett
 Bobby Rahal
 Paul Tracy
 André Ribeiro
 Greg Moore
 Richie Hearn
 Al Unser Jr.
 Mark Blundell
 Adrian Fernandez
 Bryan Herta
 Patrick Carpentier
 Maurício Gugelmin
 Max Papis
 Hélio Castroneves (R)
 Robby Gordon
 P. J. Jones
 Michel Jourdain Jr.
 Arnd Meier
 JJ Lehto (R)
 Alex Barron (R)
 Gualter Salles

Race

Lap 17
Richie Hearn locked up the right front tire and spun on turn 1. Top 6 was composed by: Dario Franchitti, Alex Zanardi, Michael Andretti, Gil de Ferran, Jimmy Vasser and Paul Tracy.

Lap 26
First full course caution. Michel Jourdain Jr. and Alex Barron collided at the hairpin. Arnd Meier stalled the car metres in front and started a jampack. Meanwhile, Gil de Ferran retired after an incident in the pits. Christian Fittipaldi had problems, also, but did not retired.

Lap 27
Top 6: Dario Franchitti, Michael Andretti, Jimmy Vasser, Paul Tracy, Alex Zanardi and Tony Kanaan.

Lap 30
Before going green, Patrick Carpentier collided with Mark Blundell on turn 9.

Lap 32
Second full course caution, as Blundell's car stalled on turn 9, following the collision with Carpentier. On lap 36, green flag came out.

Lap 38
JJ Lehto had a big crash. Third full course caution. Green flag came out some laps later.

Lap 52
Top 6: Dario Franchitti, Michael Andretti, Jimmy Vasser, Alex Zanardi, Tony Kanaan and Paul Tracy.

Lap 61
Tony Kanaan had a pit fire. Meanwhile, in the hairpin, Alex Zanardi had a collision with his teammate Jimmy Vasser.

Lap 68
Gualter Salles had a collision at the hairpin with Al Unser Jr. and went airborne.

16 laps to go
Dario Franchitti spun and stalled, ending his day. Paul Tracy slightly t-boned him. Fourth full course caution was out. Green flag came out with 11 laps to go.

8 laps to go
Top 6: Michael Andretti, Alex Zanardi, Jimmy Vasser, Bobby Rahal, Bryan Herta and Scott Pruett.

5 laps to go
Paul Tracy and Adrian Fernandez collided on turn 1 while they were battling for 9th place.

3 laps to go
Alex Zanardi overtakes Michael Andretti at the hairpin.

Classification

Race

Caution flags

Lap leaders

Point standings after race

References

Molson Indy Toronto
Molson Indy Toronto
Indy Toronto
Molson Indy Toronto